Frances Dee Cook (born September 7, 1945, Charleston, West Virginia) was a career Foreign Service Officer who was the US Ambassador to the Republic of Burundi from 1980–1983, Ambassador to the Republic of Cameroon, 1989–1993 and she was sworn in as the U.S. Ambassador to the Sultanate of Oman on December 28, 1995.

As Ambassador to Oman and Consul General in Alexandria, Egypt, she was the first female chief of mission in the Persian Gulf, and the first female head of post in the Middle East for the United States.

Cook heads her own international business consulting firm, The Ballard Group and is Managing Director of the Quincy Group, a strategic advisory firm and merchant bank.

Early life and education
Cook was born in Charleston, West Virginia to Nash and Vivian Cook but grew up in Homestead, Florida. She earned a BA from  Mary Washington College of the University of Virginia in 1967. In 1978, she received a M.P.A. from the John F. Kennedy School of Government at Harvard University.

Career
After joining the Foreign Service in 1967 and completing language school, Cook’s first assignment was to be Special Assistant to Sargent Shriver, Ambassador to France from 1968–1969. Her future posts included being a member of the U.S. Delegation to Paris Peace Talks on Vietnam, 1970–1971; U.S. Consulate General, Sydney, Australia, 1971–1973; U.S. Embassy, Dakar, Senegal, 1973–1975; Personnel Officer for Africa, USIA, 1975–1977; Director of the Press Office, Bureau of African Affairs, Department of State, 1978–1980; Consul General, Alexandria, Egypt, 1983–1986; Deputy Assistant Secretary of State for International Assistance, Bureau of Refugee Programs, 1986–1987; Director, Office of West Africa Affairs, Department of State, 1987–1989; and Deputy Assistant Secretary of State for Regional Security Affairs, Bureau of Political-Military Affairs, 1993–1995. From 2010–2020, Cook served as a member of the board of trustees at The American College of the Mediterranean (ACM), an American-style degree-granting institution in Aix-en-Provence, France, which includes IAU College, a study abroad institute for undergraduates.

References

1945 births
People from Charleston, West Virginia
People from Homestead, Florida
University of Mary Washington alumni
Harvard Kennedy School alumni
Ambassadors of the United States to Burundi
Ambassadors of the United States to Cameroon
Ambassadors of the United States to Oman
American women ambassadors
Living people
American consuls
21st-century American women